Pleasant Hill Township is a township in Sullivan County, in the U.S. state of Missouri.

Pleasant Hill Township was erected in 1845.

References

Townships in Missouri
Townships in Sullivan County, Missouri